The New Oxford Book of Carols is a collection of vocal scores of Christmas carols. It was first published in 1992 by Oxford University Press (OUP) and was edited by Hugh Keyte and Andrew Parrott.  It is a widely used source of carols in among choirs and church congregations in Britain.

The collection was published as a successor to the Oxford Book of Carols, originally published in 1928.  This thoroughly documented text contains notes on sources, histories and variants of carols from a wide variety of sources; it is usable not only as a book for carol singing, but as a reference book as well.  A Shorter New Oxford Book of Carols was issued in 1992, and other selections have been made.

History
The original Oxford Book of Carols was first published in 1928 by OUP. It was edited by Percy Dearmer,  Martin Shaw, and the noted composer and scholar of English folk-song  Ralph Vaughan Williams. The book was highly influential as it introduced British choirs and church congregations (who were more accustomed to Victorian hymn tunes) to a form of Christmas music rooted in traditional folk music.

The New Oxford Book of Carols  started life as a recording tie-in project with Faber Music, consisting of a limited number of carols. Under the direction of OUP's senior editor Julian Elloway, the project grew beyond its initial concept to a published collection of 201 vocal pieces accompanied by a substantial body of historically informed arranging and editorial commentary. The volume contains two essays, and each carol is accompanied by detailed annotations; this supporting editorial material is considered to be a valuable resource for historians, church musicians, and musicologists.

See also
 List of Christmas carols

References

1992 non-fiction books
Music books
Christmas carol collections
Carols, Oxford Book Of